Pico do Jaraguá (Jaraguá Peak) is the highest mountain in the Brazilian city of São Paulo, at 1135 metres above sea level, located at the Serra da Cantareira. Jaraguá means Lord of the Valley in Tupi.

History 

In 1580, Afonso Sardinha was settled on the mountain, and found gold there. However, due to the indigenous people who lived there at that time, the mining only began ten years later, after numerous wars. The gold was explored until it was not possible to find it any more, by the 19th century.

In 1961, the Parque Estadual do Jaraguá (Jaraguá State Park) was created. Soon, TV Globo, Bandeirantes and TV Cultura were allowed to build their TV transmitting masts on the mountain. A  mast was placed on the highest peak, through a Globo-Bandeirantes partnership, while TV Cultura had its mast build on the nearby lower peak.

By 1994, the Parque Estadual do Jaraguá was nominated for World Heritage Site by UNESCO.

References

External links 
 Pico do Jaraguá - Jaraguá State Park

Geography of São Paulo
Landforms of São Paulo (state)
Mountains of Brazil
Parks in Brazil
Protected areas of São Paulo (state)
Tourist attractions in São Paulo